Gurey is both a given name and a surname. Notable people with the name include:

Adan Ali Gurey, Dhulbahante monarch and commander of Golaweyne
Ahmed Gurey (1506–1543), general of Adal kingdom
Aadan-Gurey Maxamed Cabdille (1840–1920), Somali poet

See also
Gurney (surname)